The 1983 KFK competitions in Ukraine were part of the 1983 Soviet KFK competitions that were conducted in the Soviet Union. It was 19th season of the KFK in Ukraine since its introduction in 1964. The winner eventually qualified to the 1984 Soviet Second League.

First stage

Group 1

Group 2

Group 3

Group 4

Group 5

Group 6

Final

References

Ukrainian Football Amateur League seasons
Amateur